Tahar Bekri (born 1951) is a Paris-based Tunisian poet and literary critic.

Early life
Tahar Bekri was born on July 7, 1951 in Gabès, Tunisia.

Career
Bekri has taught Literature of the Maghreb at Paris 13 University since 1985. He has published several books of literary criticism, including one about Algerian poet Malek Haddad. He defines Maghreb Literature as literary texts published by authors from Tunisia, Algeria and Morocco who use colloquialisms in French, Arabic and Berber.

Bekri has published poetry collections in French and in Arabic.

Works

Poetry collections

Non-fiction

Further reading

References

Living people
1951 births
People from Gabès
20th-century Tunisian poets
Tunisian literary critics
Tunisian expatriates in France
Academic staff of the University of Paris
21st-century Tunisian poets